International Day of the Midwife was first celebrated May 5, 1991, and has since been observed in over 50 nations around the world.

The idea of having a day to recognize and honor midwives came out of the 1987 International Confederation of Midwives conference in the Netherlands. 
In 2014 it was celebrated in Iran and New Zealand among other places.

References

External links
 UNFPA

May observances
Midwifery
Midwives